The Angrivarii (or Angrivari) were a Germanic people of the early Roman Empire, who lived in what is now northwest Germany near the middle of the Weser river. They were mentioned by the Roman authors Tacitus and Ptolemy.

They were part of the Germanic alliance of Arminius and his defeat of the Romans at the Battle of the Teutoburg Forest in the 9th year of the common era.

The Angrivarii lived in an area which was later called Angria (Modern German "") in the Middle Ages, which was a major part of the Carolingian Duchy of Saxony. Both names probably derive from geographical terminology.

Location
In his Germania Tacitus described the Angrivarii and their western neighbours the Chamavi living closer to the Rhine than "the Dulgubini and Chasuarii, and other tribes not equally famous" and east of the Frisii who lived towards the Rhine river which was the official border of the Roman Empire. The Chasuarii probably lived near the Hase river and the Ampsivarii who lived on the Ems river, and the Dulgubini probably towards the Elbe. North of all these peoples lived the Chauci, whose territory stretched to the North Sea coast.

Among the more detailed mentions of the Angrivarii which Tacitus makes in his Annals, he describes them also as neighbours to the powerful Cherusci people, of Arminius. They had built a dike to mark the boundary and this was west of the Weser.

Tacitus also notes in his Germania that together with the Chamavi, the Angrivarii had invaded the lands formerly held by the Bructeri to their southwest, the Bructeri having been expelled and utterly destroyed by an alliance of neighboring peoples.... The Bructeri had lived near the Ems and Lippe rivers, between the Rhine and Weser. This occurred after the battle of the Teutoburg Forest.

Name and etymology

The name appears earliest in the Annales and Germania of Tacitus as Angrivarii. In Greek, Ptolemy  called them the Angriouarroi, which transliterates into Latin Angrivari. In post-classical history the name of the people had a number of different spellings in addition to the ones just mentioned.

The name Angrivarii can be segmented Angri-varii meaning "the men of Engern", parallel to Ampsi-varii, "the men of the Ems". Engern, their region, is related to a word for meadows, as in modern German "", and appears as a component in placenames around Germany.

Julius Pokorny derives the first element from an Indo-European root *ang-, "to bend, bow." From this root are also derived German Anger, English dialect ing, Danish eng, Swedish äng, Dutch eng/enk, and many other forms in Germanic languages, all meaning "meadow, pasture." Cf. the similar element Angeln.

The second element -varii is most prolific among Germanic tribal names, commonly taken to mean "inhabitants of", "dwellers in". Its precise etymology remains unclear, but there is a general consensus that it cannot be derived from the PIE root *wihxrós, "man", surviving in English "were-wolf".

Their geographical-based name is associated with the 8th century region called Angria (Angaria, Angeriensis, Aggerimensis and Engaria), which was one of four subdivisions of Old Saxony (the others were Westfalahi and Ostfalahi and Nordalbingia). This region is now referred to in modern German as Engern, and it corresponds reasonably well with the area where the Angrivarii lived, comprising most of the country surrounding the middle Weser, including both flat land, as around Minden, and low hills (Holzminden).

Ancient history

Although the Angrivarii receive brief mention in Ptolemy (2.10) and the Germania of Tacitus (33), they appear mainly at several locations in Annales. They were involved marginally in the wars fought by the talented Germanicus Caesar on behalf of his uncle Tiberius, emperor of Rome, against the perpetrators of the massacre of three Roman legions in the Battle of the Teutoburg Forest, the year 9. 

The wars began in the last years of the reign of Augustus, first emperor of Rome. Augustus died an old but respected man in the year 14 and was celebrated with much pomp and splendor. He left a document to be read to the senate posthumously, expressly forbidding extension of the empire beyond the Rhine. News of the will was welcomed by the Germans, thinking it gave them a free hand in the region. Germanicus found it necessary to pacify the border, which he did by a combination of scorched earth raids and offers of alliance with Rome - in short, stick and carrot.  These raids also kept the army of the lower Rhine distracted from the possibility of mutiny, which had broken out on Augustus's death and only been quelled by concessions and executions.

For punitive expeditions Germanicus used the Ems river, which flowed from the heart of the country occupied by the tribes that became the Franks. These were still under Arminius, who had led the German confederation to the victory in 9. Unlike Arminius' native tribe, the Cherusci, the loyalty of the other tribes in the confederation was at best equivocal.

The Angrivarii's defection or revolt (defectio) in the middle of Arminius's renewed operations against the Teutoburg Forest must have been secured in advance by Germanicus.  Even if it was not, a cavalry attack soon brought the Angrivarii's capitulation.  Soon afterwards, however, they are back in alliance with the Cherusci and opposition to the Romans, setting an ambush at the Cheruscan border, which was a high dirt embankment. They hid their cavalry in the woods and stationed their infantry on the reverse slope of the bank. The Romans had intelligence of the plan beforehand. They assaulted the embankment, preceding their assault with volleys from slings and spears thrown by machines. Driving the Angrivarii from the bank, they went on to pursue the cavalry in the woods. Once again the Angrivarii were totally routed.

Once the Cherusci had been dealt with, Germanicus turned his attention to the Angrivarii. They, however, surrendered unconditionally to the general sent by Germanicus and placed themselves in the status of suppliants, begging for mercy, which Germanicus granted.  This later reaped dividends for the Angrivarii played a major role in securing the return of ships and men lost in a North Sea storm which scattered the Roman fleet upon the shore of hostile or neutral Germanic tribes.

Finally, on May 26 of the year 17, Germanicus celebrated a triumph for his victory over lower Germany and his uncle sent him off to the east. Arminius died and the Angrivarii, the other west Germans and their successor tribes continued friendly towards Rome, providing it with elite troops and urban and palace police. Together with the Cherusci and the Chatti, the Angrivari belong to the three tribes that Tacitus particularly emphasizes in his account of the triumphal march of Germanicus in 17 AD:

See also
 Battle of the Teutoburg Forest
 Barbarian invasions
 List of ancient Germanic peoples
 Angrivarian Wall
 Battle of the Angrivarian Wall

Notes

References 
 Bjordvand, Harald; Lindeman, Fredrik Otto (2007). Våre arveord. Novus. .

External links 
Tacitus' Germania
The Annals by Tacitus
The Geography of Ptolemy (2.10)

Early Germanic peoples
Old Saxony
Saxons
History of Lower Saxony
History of North Rhine-Westphalia
Germania